As part of the Arab–Israeli conflict, especially during the Second Intifada from 2000 to 2005, Palestinian militant groups used children for suicide bombings. Minors were recruited to attack Israeli targets, both military and civilian. This deliberate involvement of children in armed conflict was condemned by international human rights organizations.

According to Amnesty International, "Palestinian armed groups have repeatedly shown total disregard for the most fundamental human rights, notably the right to life, by deliberately targeting Israeli civilians and by using Palestinian children in armed attacks. Children are susceptible to recruitment by manipulation or may be driven to join armed groups for a variety of reasons, including a desire to avenge relatives or friends killed by the Israeli army." 

At the height of the phenomenon, Avraham Burg, former chairman of the Jewish Agency for Israel, speaker of Israel's Knesset and interim President of Israel, stated his view that, given Israeli indifference to the tortured lives of Palestinian children under occupation, suicide bombings come as no surprise.

History
According to the Coalition to Stop the Use of Child Soldiers "2004 Global Report on the Use of Child Soldiers", there were at least nine documented suicide attacks involving Palestinian minors between October 2000 and March 2004. In 2004, the Coalition to Stop the Use of Child Soldiers reported that "there was no evidence of systematic recruitment of children by Palestinian armed groups," also noting that this remains a small fraction of the problem in other conflict zones such as Africa, where there are an estimated 20,000 children involved in active combat roles in the Sudan alone. Human Rights Watch also reported that "there was no evidence that the Palestinian Authority (PA) recruited or used child soldiers."

According to the Palestinian Human Rights Monitoring Group, in the al-Aqsa Intifada, children were used as "messengers and couriers, and in some cases as fighters and suicide bombers in attacks on Israeli soldiers and civilians" during the al-Aqsa Intifada. Fatah, Hamas, Palestinian Islamic Jihad Movement and the Popular Front for the Liberation of Palestine have all been implicated in involving children in this way. The issue was brought to world attention after a widely televised incident in which a mentally handicapped Palestinian teenager, Hussam Abdo, was disarmed at an Israeli checkpoint. The youngest Palestinian suicide bomber who blew himself up was Issa Bdeir, a 16-year-old high school student from the village of Al Doha. He blew himself up in a park in Rishon LeZion, killing a teenage boy and an elderly man.

According to the Israel Defense Forces, 29 suicide attacks were carried out by youth under the age of 18 in 2000–2003. From May 2001, 22 shootings attacks and attacks using explosive devices were carried out by youth under the age of 18, and more than 40 youths under the age of 18 were involved in attempted suicide bombings that were thwarted (three in 2004).

On March 24, 2004, one week after capturing a bomb in the bag of 12-year-old Abdullah Quran, Hussam Abdo, a 16-year-old Palestinian (who initially claimed he was 14), was captured in a checkpoint near Nablus wearing an explosive belt. The young boy was paid by the Tanzim militia to detonate himself at the checkpoint. IDF soldiers manning the checkpoint were suspicious of him and told him to stay away from people. Later, an EOD team arrived and by using a police-sapper robot, removed the explosive belt from him. Hussam explained that he was offered 100 NIS and sex with virgins if he would perform the task. He said his friends mocked him in class.

On May 30, 2004, The New York Times reported Israeli allegations that the al-Aqsa Martyrs' Brigades were using children to recruit classmates as suicide bombers, and that one child, Nasser Awartani, 15, of Nablus allegedly recruited four of his classmates, one of whom was claimed by the Shabak report on Awartani to be Hussam Abdo.

On June 16, 2004, two girls, aged 14 and 15, were arrested by the IDF for allegedly plotting a suicide bombing. According to an IDF statement, the two children were recruited by activists from Tanzim (Fatah's armed wing), guided by Hezbollah.

On July 3, the Israeli Security Forces thwarted a suicide bombing that it claimed was to have been carried out by 16-year-old Muataz Takhsin Karini. Karini and two of his operators were arrested, while a 12 kg explosive belt was detonated safely by an Israeli EOD crew. On June 5, IDF forces detonated two explosive belts concealed in schoolbags. On July 14, the Shin Bet in Kfar Maskha arrested 17-year-old suicide bomber Ahmed Bushkar, from Nablus.

On September 23, 2004, a day before Yom Kippur, the Shin Bet and the Israel Police announced their capture of a 15-year-old suicide bomber and a 7 kg explosive belt in the village of Dir-Hana in the Western Galilee. The 15-year-old was part of joint terrorist cell of Tanzim and Palestinian Islamic Jihad from Yamon village near Jenin. The four were Palestinians who worked illegally in Israel. The 15-year-old was allegedly paid 1000 shekels in order to blow himself up in Afula.

According to a Shabak report published on September 26, 2004, about 292 Palestinian children have been involved in terrorism.

On September 27, 2004, a 15-year-old suspected suicide bomber was arrested in Nablus. On October 28, Ayub Maaruf, a 16-year-old Fatah suicide bomber, was arrested near Nablus along with his operator.

On November 1, 16-year-old Aamer Alfar blew himself up in Tel Aviv's Carmel Market, killing 3 Israelis in a suicide bombing that was claimed by the Popular Front for the Liberation of Palestine. Alfar's mother and father condemned what they saw as the exploitation of their son:

God will curse those who recruited Amar. I had heard the stories about recruiting children in Nablus but I didn't think they were true... Yes, it is difficult here for everyone because of the occupation, and life in Nablus is intolerable, but children should not be exploited in this way.

On February 3, 2005, Mahmoud Tabouq, a 15- or 16-year-old Palestinian, was arrested at the Huwara checkpoint near Nablus carrying a bag containing an explosive belt, an improvised gun, and 20 bullets. The belt was detonated safely by a Magav bomb squad.

On April 12, a 15-year-old Palestinian boy identified as Hassan Hashash was caught at Huwara checkpoint hiding five pipe bombs under his coat. He tried to ignite them with a match when the soldiers apprehended him. Later he was disarmed, and sappers detonated the bombs safely. Family members of Hashash suggested that he deliberately carried bombs into an IDF checkpoint in order to be arrested and study for the "Bagrut" final exams in the Israeli jail. A week later, another Palestinian youth (aged 17) was caught carrying explosives in Beit Furik checkpoint.

On April 27, two teenagers, aged 15 (though other sources cite their ages as 12 and 13), were arrested at a checkpoint near Jenin after 11 explosive charges were found on them. One teenager was recruited by the Palestinian Islamic Jihad and the other by the al-Aqsa Martyrs' Brigades. The two told interrogators that they had been acting as couriers for terrorists, but security forces suspect they planned to get close to the soldiers and then detonate the charges.

On May 22, Iad Ladi, a 14- or 15-year-old Palestinian suicide bomber was arrested at a Huwara checkpoint near Nablus. This was the 14th time during April and May that a Palestinian child was arrested as a bomber or a courier. Two days later, another 15-year-old Palestinian teen carrying two pipe bombs, was caught at the same checkpoint. On June 15, The Israeli press reported that the Shabak arrested a Palestinian militant cell in Nablus during the previous month. The cell included eight members, four of whom were child suicide bombers. The cell was on the verge of committing another suicide bombing attack using the four children. According to the Shin Bet, the cell was directed and funded by the Fatah's Tanzim branch and the Lebanese group Hezbollah.

On October 11, a 14-year-old Palestinian boy was arrested by IDF forces. He told the soldiers he was forced to agree to commit a suicide bombing when two terrorists from Fatah's Tanzim faction threatened to murder him by spreading a leaflet accusing him of collaboration unless he agreed. They took pictures of him with a gun and the Qur'an and forced him to write his own will.

On August 27, a 15-year-old Palestinian boy carrying two explosive devices on his body was arrested in the northern Gaza Strip after he attempted to carry out an attack against soldiers operating in the area against Palestinians launching Qassam rockets on Israeli civilians across the border inside Israel.

Psychological triggers and indoctrination

According to emeritus professor of psychiatry at the University of Virginia School of Medicine Vamik Volkan,

Most suicide bombers in the Middle East are chosen as teenagers, "educated", and then sent off to perform their duty when they are in their late teens or early to mid-twenties. The "education" is most effective when religious elements of the large-group identity are provided as solutions for the personal sense of helplessness, shame, and humiliation. Replacing borrowed elements sanctioned by God for one's internal world makes that person omnipotent and supports the individual's narcissism.

I found that there was little difficulty in finding young men interested in becoming suicide bombers in Gaza and the West Bank. Repeated actual and expected events humiliate youngsters and interfere with their adaptive identifications with their parents because their parents are humiliated as well.

Volkan gives the examples of beatings, torture, or the loss of a parent as typical humiliating events that might make a young person more susceptible to recruitment for suicide terrorism.

Once recruited, children and teenagers are encouraged to cut off contact with "real world" affairs and subjected to an intense program of memorization and repetition of the Qur'an based more on sound than on meaning.

The typical technique of creating Middle Eastern Muslim suicide bombers includes two basic steps: first, the "teachers" find young people whose personal identity is already disturbed and who are seeking an outer "element" to internalize so they can stabilize their internal world. Second, they develop a "teaching method" that "forces" the large-group identity, ethnic and/or religious, into the "cracks" of the person's damaged or subjugated individual identity. Once people become candidates to be suicide bombers, the routine rules and regulations, so to speak, or individual psychology does not fully apply to their patterns of thought and action.

Anne Speckhard, adjunct associate Professor of Psychiatry, Georgetown University Medical Center and Professor of Psychology, Vesalius College, Free University of Brussels, writes:

In the Palestinian territories, there currently exists a "cult of martyrdom". From a very young age children are socialized into a group consciousness that honors "martyrs", including human bombers who have given their lives for the fight against what is perceived by Palestinians to be the unjust occupation of their lands. Young children are told stories of "martyrs". Many young people wear necklaces venerating particular "martyrs", posters decorate the walls of towns and rock and music videos extol the virtues of bombers. Each act of suicide terrorism is also marked by a last testament and video, which are prepared ahead of time by the "martyr" who can later reach great popularity when the video is played on television. Despite the very deep and real grief of the family and friends left behind, the funerals of "martyrs" are generally accompanied with much fanfare by community and sponsoring organization. Often, the effect of this is confusing to outsiders as it can disrupt, delay and even circumvent the family's ability to focus on its grief over the loss of a family member and it may even support the family in claiming to outsiders joy over the loss of its loved one. This "cult of martyrdom", which has a strong underpinning in longstanding cultural roots (the honoring of martyrs), appears to have developed principally over the last decade, as the first act of suicide terrorism occurred in Israel only twelve years ago.

Umm Nidal, who sent three of her sons, including one 17-year-old, on suicide attacks, said "I love my children, but as Muslims we pressure ourselves and sacrifice our emotions for the interest of the homeland. The greater interest takes precedence to the personal interest." She was later elected to the Palestinian legislature on the Hamas ticket. According to Human Rights Watch, Major Palestinian armed groups, including Al-Aqsa Martyrs Brigade, the Popular Front for the Liberation of Palestine, Islamic Jihad, and Hamas, have publicly disavowed the use of children in military operations, but those stated policies have not always been implemented. Some leaders, including representatives of Islamic Jihad and Hamas, have said that they consider children of 16 to be adults. International law defines a child as any person under the age of eighteen. [...] Israeli government policy in the Occupied Territories defines Palestinians under the age of 16 as minors while Israeli children in the same territories are considered minors until they reach the age of 18.

Cultural references
In 2002, the circulation of a photo showing an 18-month infant dressed like a suicide bomber was a source of media attention. According to BBC News the baby's grandfather, Redwan Abu Turki, said that the dressing of the infant baby as a bomber was from a rally at the university and "the picture was taken just for the fun of it." Israeli newspapers published the photo under headlines such as "Terror in Diapers" and "Born to Kill".

While Palestinian officials dismissed it as a propaganda trick, Haaretz reported that a Palestinian journalist in the Hebron area said she did not believe the picture was a fake and expressed surprise at the furor it caused in Israel, noting: "I can find you many, many photos like this," she said. "Many kids imitate adults and wear toy masks and guns, especially during marches. It's not strange at all". She added that she had seen children as young as the one in the photograph wearing similar costumes: "In our society it happens a lot. It's a kind of phenomenon."

Other photos of children dressed up as militants have been published since then.

See also 

 List of Palestinian militant groups suicide attacks
 The Making of a Martyr
 Female suicide bomber
 Military use of children
 Palestinian political violence
 Human rights in the Palestinian National Authority

References

Further reading
Landau, Elaine (2007). Suicide Bombers: Foot Soldiers of the Terrorist Movement. Twenty-First Century Books. 

Carpenter, Charli R. (2006). Innocent Women And Children: Gender, Norms and the Protection of Civilians. Ashgate Publishing, Ltd. 
Charny, Israel W. (2006). Fighting Suicide Bombing: A Worldwide Campaign for Life. Greenwood Press.

External links
 The Children's Rights Institute
 Suicide Bombers by Vamik D. Volkan of the University of Virginia
 
 
 
  In southern Punjab, madrassas facilitate the recruitment of children into militant groups to learn to become suicide bombers.

Suicide bombing in the Israeli–Palestinian conflict
Palestine